Kocbeře is a municipality and village in Trutnov District in the Hradec Králové Region of the Czech Republic. It has about 500 inhabitants.

Administrative parts
Villages of Nová Ves and Nové Kocbeře are administrative parts of Kocbeře.

References

Villages in Trutnov District